The Martindale is a unit for quantifying the abrasion resistance of textiles, especially when used for upholstery.

The Martindale method, also known as the Martindale rub test, simulates natural wear of a seat cover, in which the textile sample is rubbed against a standard abrasive surface with a specified force. The test equipment works in intervals of 5000 cycles, totalling the wear number (unit: Martindale) of abrasion cycles that leads to the material being worn to a specified degree. The higher the value, the more resistant the material is to abrasion.

In upholstery, the Martindale Test abrasion rub test is internationally recognised and designed to measure the durability of a fabric according to the number of times discs can oscillate a layer of sandpaper or wool across the fabric before it starts to show distress. Each fabric is divided into categories by numerical score showing how durable it is. These categories range from decorative use, light domestic use, general domestic use, heavy domestic use and commercial use.

The results of the test show how much wear and tear your fabric will take before there is a noticeable change in its appearance. As mentioned, the higher the score, the more durable the fabric is. Below is a short list of each category that your chosen fabric could be in and how suitable it will be for different uses.

The national German textile institute specifies a minimum requirement for various applications, and here are some examples:

Material for use by police or emergency services may require values of 200,000 to 500,000.

In the US, the Wyzenbeek test is often used instead of the Martindale.

The Martindale machine also tests for fabric pilling.

References

External links 

 Table of contents of DIN EN ISO 12947-1:2007-04 by Beuth-Verlag

Units of quality
Textile engineering